Bal Harbour Shops is an open-air shopping mall in Bal Harbour, a suburb of Miami Beach, Florida. With sales of $3,400 per square foot in 2022, it is one of the highest grossing shopping centers in the world. Notable retailers and restaurants include Salvatore Ferragamo, Alexander McQueen, Audemars Piguet, Balenciaga, Balmain, Bottega Veneta, Brioni, Bvlgari, Chanel, Chloé, Chopard, Dolce & Gabbana, Fendi, Goyard, Golden Goose, Graff, Gucci, Harry Winston, James Perse, Missoni, Miu Miu, Prada, Richard Mille, Rolex, Saint Laurent, Stella McCartney, Tiffany & Co., Tod's, Van Cleef & Arpels, Versace, Zegna, Zimmermann, Makoto, Le Zoo, Carpaccio, and Hillstone. The anchors are Neiman Marcus and Saks Fifth Avenue.

History
From 1954 to 1962, Stanley Whitman travelled around the U.S. studying shopping centers.

In 1957, Whitman acquired the site for $2 per square foot, then a record price for retail property. It was the site of a former United States Army barracks and World War II prisoner of war camp. He  built a non-traditional open-air shopping mall due to the tropical climate and seaside location across the street from the Atlantic ocean.

At first, Whitman hired architect Victor Gruen, but then fired him and hired Herb Johnson, based in Miami.

In 1965, the shopping center opened. 1965 Inaugural collection stores included FAO Schwarz, Abercrombie & Fitch and Martha's, considered one of the most influential international women’s salons hosting fashion shows with designers Valentino and Oscar de la Renta (both of whom would later open boutiques at Bal Harbour Shops). Early European Designer store openings included Yves Saint Laurent and Gucci. A few years later Cartier, Versace and Chanel opened. 

In 1971, Neiman Marcus opened a department  store at the center. In 1976, Saks Fifth Avenue opened a department store at the center. In 1977, Gucci opened a store at the center. By 1987, it realized sales of $1,000 per square foot.

In 1982, Bal Harbour Shops was the first shopping center planned for vertical expansion to add  of retail space on Level 2. In 1983, a second level was added.

Overall sales at the shopping center rose from $1,000 per square foot in 1997, 5 times the national average, to $1,350 per square foot in 2002, $2,000 per square foot in 2008, $2,730 per square foot in 2012, and $3,000 per square foot in 2015. In 2022, shopping mall had sales of $3,400 per square foot.

In 2012, the Whitman family struck a land swap deal with Church by the Sea. Bal Harbour Shops agreed to build a  church.

In January 2013, Bal Harbour Shops announced an equity partnership with Swire Properties to jointly develop the  retail component of Brickell CityCentre in downtown Miami.

In 2017 the 550 million enhancement plan was approved to add  of new retail space and restaurants to Bal Harbour Shops with a completion date of 2024.

References

Shopping malls in Miami-Dade County, Florida
Shopping malls established in 1965
Luxury